The South Korea Fed Cup team represents South Korea in Fed Cup tennis competition and are governed by the Korea Tennis Association.  They currently compete in the Asia/Oceania Zone of Group I.

History
South Korea competed in its first Fed Cup in 1973.  Their best result was qualifying for World Group II in 1997, and reaching the round of 16 on five occasions.

Current team (2017)
 Jang Su-jeong
 Han Na-lae
 Kim Na-ri
 Choi Ji-hee

Players
Last Updated: 27 August 2019

See also
Fed Cup
South Korea Davis Cup team

External links

Korea, South
Fed Cup
Fed Cup